Abusahl-Hamazasp Artsruni (died 968/969) was the third King of Vaspurakan, from the Artsruni dynasty, succeeding his childless elder brother, Derenik-Ashot, on the latter's death. On his death in 968/969, his kingdom was divided among his three sons, Ashot-Sahak, Gurgen-Khachik of Vaspurakan, and Seneqerim-Hovhannes, who each became king in succession.

References

960s deaths
10th-century monarchs of Vaspurakan
Artsruni dynasty
Year of birth unknown
10th-century Armenian people